Aḥmad ibn ‘Abd al-Muṭṭalib ibn Ḥasan ibn Abī Numayy was Emir of Mecca and ruler of the Hejaz from 1628 to 1629.

He was proclaimed Emir in Jeddah in late Safar 1037 AH (November 1627) by Kurji Ahmad Pasha, the governor of Yemen, after the latter had a dispute with Sharif Muhsin ibn Husayn. After Muhsin surrendered, Ahmad entered Mecca as Emir on Sunday, 17 Ramadan 1037 AH (21 May 1628).

He was assassinated by order of Kansuh Pasha, governor of Yemen, in the 5th hour of the night, on Sunday, 5 Safar 1039 (around 10–11 pm on Saturday night, 22 September 1629).

Notes

References
 

 
 

Sharifs of Mecca
Banu Qatadah
1629 deaths
17th-century Arabs